The 2009 Men's World Team Squash Championships is the men's edition of the 2009 World Team Squash Championships organized by the World Squash Federation, which serves as the world team championship for squash players. The event were held in Odense, Denmark and took place from September 27 to October 3, 2009. The tournament was organized by the World Squash Federation and the Danish Squash Federation. The Egypt team won his second World Team Championships beating the French team in the final.

Participating teams 
A total of 28 teams competed from all the five confederations: Africa, America, Asia, Europe and Oceania. For Serbia, it was their first participation at a world team championship.

Seeds

Squads 

  Egypt
 Karim Darwish
 Amr Shabana
 Ramy Ashour
 Wael El Hindi

  Hong Kong
 Dick Lau
 Max Lee
 Leo Au
 Anson Kwong

  Kuwait
 Abdullah Al Muzayen
 Bader Al-Hussaini
 Salem Fayez Mohammed
 Ammar Abldulkareem Altamimi

  Serbia
 Dennis Drenjovski
 Daniel Zilic
 Ivan Djordjevic
 Marko Matanovic

  England
 Nick Matthew
 Peter Barker
 James Willstrop
 Adrian Grant

  Germany
 Simon Rösner
 Jens Schoor
 Stefan Leifels
 Raphael Kandra

  Austria
 Aqeel Rehman
 Jakob Dirnberger
 Stefan Brauneis
 Christian Coufal

  Japan
 Yuta Fukui
 Shinnosuke Tsukue
 Takanori Shimizu
 Jun Matsumoto

  France
 Grégory Gaultier
 Thierry Lincou
 Renan Lavigne
 Julien Balbo

  Ireland
 Liam Kenny
 John Rooney
 Arthur Gaskin
 Derek Ryan

  Denmark
 Rasmus Nielsen
 Kristian Frost Olesen
 Kim Povlsen
 Danny Knudsen

  Australia
 David Palmer
 Stewart Boswell
 Cameron Pilley
 Aaron Frankcomb

  Netherlands
 Laurens Jan Anjema
 Piëdro Schweertman
 Rene Mijs
 Sebastiaan Weenink

  Wales
 Rob Sutherland
 Jethro Binns
 Peter Creed
 Nic Birt

  Malaysia
 Ong Beng Hee
 Mohd Azlan Iskandar
 Mohd Nafiizwan Adnan
 Ivan Yuen

  United States
 Julian Illingworth
 Gilly Lane
 Chris Gordon
 Preston Quick

  Finland
 Olli Tuominen
 Henrik Mustonen
 Matias Tuomi
 Hammed Ahmed

  Pakistan
 Aamir Atlas Khan
 Farhan Mehboob
 Yasir Butt
 Mansoor Zaman

  South Africa
 Steve Coppinger
 Rodney Durbach
 Jesse Engelbrecht
 Clinton Leeuw

  Sweden
 Rasmus Hult
 Carl-Johan Lofvenborg
 Joakim Larsson
 Andre Wikstorm

  Kenya
 Hardeep Reel
 Hartaj Bains
 Rajdeep Bains
 Joseph Ndung'u Karigit

  Canada
 Jonathon Power
 Shahier Razik
 Shawn Delierre
 David Philips

  New Zealand
 Kashif Shuja
 Campbell Grayson
 Martin Knight
 Alex Grayson

  Spain
 David Vidal
 Alejandro Garbi
 Eduardo Gonzalez
 Carlos Cornes

  Italy
 Davide Bianchetti
 Marcus Berrett
 Amr Swelim
 Jose Facchini

  India
 Saurav Ghosal
 Ritwik Bhattacharya
 Siddharth Suchde
 Harinder Pal Sandhu

  Scotland
 Alan Clyne
 Stuart Crawford
 Chris Small
 Lyall Paterson

  Venezuela
 Francisco Valecillo
 Juan Pablo Rothie
 Juan Pablo Sanchez
 Gabriel Teran

Group stage results

Pool A

Pool B

Pool C

Pool D

Pool E

Pool F

Pool G

Pool H

Finals

Draw

Results

Quarter-finals

Semi-finals

Final

Post-tournament team ranking

See also 
World Team Squash Championships
World Squash Federation
2009 Men's World Open Squash Championship

References

External links 
SquashSite World Team 2009 Official Website

W
World Squash Championships
Squash
Sport in Odense
Squash tournaments in Denmark
International sports competitions hosted by Denmark